African Manhunt is a 1955 American adventure film directed by Seymour Friedman and written by Arthur Hoerl. The film stars Myron Healey, Karin Booth, John Kellogg, Lawrence Dobkin, Ross Elliott and James Edwards. The film was released on January 5, 1955, by Republic Pictures. African sequences from the French documentary Congolaise were edited into the film.

Plot
At a military outpost in Africa, Sergeant Drover (John Kellogg) kills his commanding officer, robs the camp safe and runs into the jungle.

Months later, U.S. Army Intelligence assigns Captain Kirby (Myron Healey) to investigate a message from a western doctor (Ray Bennett), who runs a medical clinic in a remote area.

Believing that the killer is hiding near the clinic, the Kirby arranges to be transported upriver to search for the murderer and return him to stand trial with Rene Carvel (Ross Elliott) of the French African Corps as his guide.

Just before they arrive, Drover guesses that the doctor has alerted authorities about his presence and murders him. He tries to kill his pursuers as well, but they capture and arrest him.

After burying the doctor and closing the clinic, the team begin the difficult journey back to the coast with Clark's assistant, Ann Davis (Karin Booth), and the handcuffed murderer. Of course, a love interest is formed between Ms. Davis and Captain Kirby and noticed by the observant French guide.

Continually looking for a way to escape, Drover is stuck riding in the canoe with Bob, Rene and several locals; however, when they stop to camp in the villages, Rene lets down his vigil.  Drover kills him too and escapes.

The Captain chases him and returns him to custody after chasing off an elephant trying to charge Ms. Davis.

After burying Rene, Ms. Davis and Captain Kirby get back to the river journey with criminal in tow.

Following numerous terrain difficulties, animal attacks, and assorted "Hollywoodery", Drover manages to get himself killed and Kirby saves the girl from certain death. The locals to perform a ritual dance to celebrate and the surviving protagonists decide they will stay together when they reach their destination.

Cast
 Myron Healey as Capt. Bob Kirby
 Karin Booth as Ann Davis
 John Kellogg as Sergeant Jed Drover
 Lawrence Dobkin as Commentator
 Ross Elliott as Rene Carvel
 James Edwards as Native Guide
 Ray Bennett as Dr. Clark

References

External links 
 

1955 films
American adventure films
1955 adventure films
Republic Pictures films
Films directed by Seymour Friedman
Films set in Africa
1950s English-language films
1950s American films
American black-and-white films